Thomas Cottle, Esq. (1761–1828) was a lawyer on the island of Nevis. In 1822, Thomas started to build a church for all people on the island, including slaves. "The Cottle Church", as it is now called, was completed in 1824 and opened on May 5 that year. He married Frances Huggins, daughter of Edward Huggins, one of the richest and most powerful planters in all of Nevis.

Further reading
 Hubbard, Vincent K. 2002. "Swords, Ships & Sugar". Premiere Editions International, Inc. . A complete history of Nevis. p.156

19th-century Saint Kitts and Nevis lawyers
1761 births
1828 deaths
Saint Kitts and Nevis businesspeople
Saint Kitts and Nevis people of British descent
People from Nevis